Raup may refer to one of several people:

 David M. Raup (1933–2015), American paleontologist at the University of Chicago
 Asteroid 9165 Raup, named after the paleontologist
 Hugh M. Raup (1901–1995), American botanist, ecologist and geographer
 Robert Bruce Raup (1888–1976), American Professor of Education at the Columbia University

See also 
 Surname Raupp